The 2000 Georgia Tech Yellow Jackets football team represented the Georgia Institute of Technology in the 2000 NCAA Division I-A football season. The team's coach was George O'Leary. It played its home games at Bobby Dodd Stadium in Atlanta.

Virginia Tech
The Yellow Jackets were scheduled to play Virginia Tech at Lane Stadium in Blacksburg, Virginia in the BCA Classic, but lightning struck around the stadium as the teams were lining up for kickoff. The game eventually was canceled after a lengthy delay.

Schedule

Roster

Rankings

References

Georgia Tech
Georgia Tech Yellow Jackets football seasons
Georgia Tech Yellow Jackets football